Maharashtra State Association of Resident Doctors (MARD ) is an association of resident doctors of all the government/corporation Medical colleges and hospitals of Maharashtra, India. It was formed to address the problems faced by the resident doctors in all the Govt and Municipal Corporation run hospitals across the states by maintaining the Unity among Resident doctors of Maharashtra by standing for each and every Resident problem. MARD association is famous for the unity and strike for genuine demands Resident doctors of state.

The current president is Dr.Avinash Dahiphale  who is doing MD Community Medicine @ JJ hospital Mumbai .He has done his MBBS from GMC Latur,  2013 batch and basically from District Beed and  There were 6000 resident doctor members of association in 2021-2022.
This association consists of only MBBS doctors, no any BAMS, BHMS, BUMS doctors are included within it.

Strike
The association was on strike starting Feb 27, 2006 due to inhuman working conditions and recent increase in assault on them from relatives of patients; additionally the Maharashtra Govt failed to implement the Central Residency Scheme, which was supposed to address the inhuman living conditions provided to them in their living quarters. The strike ended on March 11, 2006, with an increase in pay to 12500 INR and assurances to form a committee to look into their problem. None of it was given in writing as demanded earlier by the striking doctors.

External links
Mard Strike Photograph
Mard Support Blog
Mard Strike Blog

Medical associations based in India